Election sejm (Polish: sejm elekcyjny) was one of three kinds of special general sejm in pre-partition Polish–Lithuanian Commonwealth. Upon vacancy of the throne, the election sejm, meeting at Wola outside Warsaw, elected a new king.

Any hereditary nobleman could vote in the Election Parliament, if present. Often close to 100,000 nobles came to those sejms.

The other two kinds of special sejm—likewise concerned with the filling of the throne—were the "convocation sejm" and the "coronation sejm."

Further reading

See also
 Royal elections in Poland

Sejm of the Polish–Lithuanian Commonwealth